The molecular formula C25H38O2 (molar mass: 370.57 g/mol, exact mass: 370.2872 u) may refer to:

 CBD-DMH, or DMH-CBD
 Dimethylheptylpyran
 JWH-051
 Penmesterol, or penmestrol
 Variecolol